The Order of the Throne is a state decoration of the Kingdom of Morocco awarded for distinguished services of a civil or military nature. The Order was instituted on 16 May 1963 by King Hassan II of Morocco, who reigned between 1961 and 1999.

Classes 
The Order of the Throne is awarded in five classes, one exceptional and four ordinary classes :
Exceptional Class or Grand Cordon, who wears the badge on a sash on the right shoulder, plus the star on the left side of the chest. This class is limited to twenty recipients at any one time.

The ordinary classes:
First Class or Grand Officer, who wears a badge on a necklet, plus a star on the left side of the chest. This class is limited to sixty recipients;
Second Class or Commander, who wears a badge on a necklet. Limited to three hundred and fifty recipients;
Third Class or Officer, who wears the badge on a ribbon with rosette on the left side of the chest. Limited to one thousand recipients;
Fourth Class or Knight, who wears the badge on a ribbon on the left side of the chest. Limited to ten thousand recipients.

Insignia 
The breast star is the five-pointed green star of the Alaouite. In the middle of the green star is depicted the Moroccan throne. The green star is placed on gold palm branches.

The badge is a smaller version of the breast star. The palm branches are made of gold for the 2nd and 3rd class or silver for the 4th class.

The ribbon of the Order is red with small green stripes near the border.

Recipients 
 Grand Cordons
 Aga Khan IV
 Princess Lalla Aicha of Morocco
 Andrew Bertie
 Princess Lalla Amina of Morocco
 Princess Lalla Asma of Morocco
 Princess Lalla Hasna of Morocco
 Princess Lalla Malika of Morocco
 Princess Lalla Meryem of Morocco
 Princess Lalla Nuzha of Morocco
 Prince Moulay Abdallah of Morocco
 Prince Moulay Rachid of Morocco
 Ahmed Osman (politician)
 Norodom Sihanouk
 Lalla Fatima Zohra
 Grand Officers
 -
 Commanders
 Amina Bouayach
 Moulay Ali Alaoui
 Driss Benhima
 Serge Berdugo
 Fouzi Lekjaa
 Walid Regragui
 Officers
 David Amar
 Morocco national football team
 Knights
 Omar Azziman
 Omar Kabbaj

References

Décret royal n° 199-66 du 1er ramadan 1386 (14 décembre 1966) portant création des ordres du Royaume - website of the government of Morocco (French)
Morocco: Order of the Throne - website Medals of the World

Orders, decorations, and medals of Morocco
Awards established in 1963